Iakovos is a transliteration of the Greek name Ἰάκωβος, which in an English form is Jacob or James.

People with the name include:

 Archbishop Iakovos of America (1911–2005), Primate of the Greek Orthodox Archdiocese of North and South America
 Iakovos Garmatis (1928–2017), Metropolitan of Chicago under the Ecumenical Patriarchate of Constantinople
 Iakovos Kambanellis (1921–2011), Greek poet and writer
 Iakovos Kolanian (born 1960), Armenian-Greek classical guitarist 
 Iakovos Milentigievits (born 1997), Greek basketball player
 Iakovos Nafpliotis (1864–1942), Archon Protopsaltis of the Holy and Great Church of Christ in Constantinople 
 Iakovos Psaltis (born 1935), Greek weightlifter
 Iakovos Rizos (1849–1926), Greek painter
 Iakovos Theofilas (1861–unknown), Greek sports shooter
 Iakovos Tombazis (c. 1782–1829), Greek ship-owner and Admiral of the Greek Navy 
 Iakovos Trivolis (died 1547), Greek Renaissance humanist and writer
 Iakovos "Jake" Tsakalidis (born 1979), Georgian-born Greek basketball player

See also
 
 Saint James (disambiguation)
 Agios Iakovos, a village in Cyprus

Masculine given names
Greek masculine given names